Pangasius pangasius, the Pangas catfish, is a species of shark catfish native to fresh and brackish waters of Bangladesh, India, Myanmar, and Pakistan. It has also been introduced to Cambodia and Vietnam. This species South Asia, the other being P. silasi from the Krishna River.

See also
 Pangasius bocourti or basa fish, important food fish with an international market

References

Pangasiidae
Catfish of Asia
Fish of Bangladesh
Fish of Myanmar
Freshwater fish of India
Fish of Pakistan
Fish described in 1822
Fish of Nepal